Russell Brown "Rusty" Wood (12 December 1929 – 1 July 2015) was an English cricketer.  Wood was a right-handed batsman who fielded as a wicket-keeper. He was born in Bristol.

Wood made his first-class debut for Gloucestershire against Cambridge University in 1950.  He made 7 further first-class appearances, the last of which came against Glamorgan in the 1951 County Championship.  In his 8 first-class matches, he scored 110 runs at an average of 12.22, with a high score of 48.  This score came on debut against Cambridge University in 1950.

He died on 1 July 2015.

References

External links
Russell Wood at ESPNcricinfo
Russell Wood at CricketArchive

1929 births
2015 deaths
Cricketers from Bristol
English cricketers
Gloucestershire cricketers
Wicket-keepers